Pouteria pisquiensis is a species of plant in the family Sapotaceae. It is endemic to Peru.

References

Trees of Peru
pisquiensis
Vulnerable plants
Taxonomy articles created by Polbot
Taxa named by Charles Baehni